Yu Shinan (558–638), courtesy name Boshi, posthumously known as Duke Wenyi of Yongxing, was a Chinese calligrapher and politician who lived in the early Tang dynasty and rose to prominence during the reign of Emperor Taizong. His uncle, Yu Ji (虞寄), also served in the Tang imperial court as an Imperial Secretary. He is regarded as one of the four greatest calligraphers in the early Tang dynasty along with Ouyang Xun, Chu Suiliang and Xue Ji, and one of the more famous ones in the history of Chinese calligraphy. Emperor Taizong once mentioned that Yu Shinan was "a man of five absolute merits".

References
 Qin, Gong, "Yu Shinan". Encyclopedia of China (Arts Edition), 1st ed.

External links
Yu Shinan and his Calligraphy Gallery at China Online Museum

558 births
638 deaths
Artists from Ningbo
7th-century Chinese calligraphers
People from Yuyao
Politicians from Ningbo
Sui dynasty politicians
Tang dynasty calligraphers
Tang dynasty politicians from Zhejiang
Transition from Sui to Tang